The Heinkel HE 3 was a sports aircraft built in Germany in the early 1920s. It was a conventional, low-wing monoplane with seating for three people in two tandem cockpits. The wing was a cantilever design, an unusual and advanced feature for the day. The fixed undercarriage was designed to be quickly changed from wheeled tailskid type to twin pontoons for operation as a seaplane. A HE 3 won first prize in its class at the 1923 aero meet at Gothenburg, and was subsequently selected as a trainer by the Swedish Navy, which bought two examples. In Swedish service, the aircraft gained the nickname Paddan ("Toad").

The HE 3 had fabric-covered wooden wings, and a plywood-covered wooden fuselage.

Operators

Swedish Navy
Swedish Air Force

Specifications (HE 3)

References
 
 

1920s German sport aircraft
HE 003
Low-wing aircraft
Single-engined tractor aircraft
Aircraft first flown in 1923